Rodrigo Guth (born 10 November 2000) is a Brazilian football player of German descent. He plays for Dutch club Fortuna Sittard.

Club career
Guth joined the youth teams of Italian club Atalanta in the summer of 2017 and started playing for their Under-19 squad. He represented Atalanta in the 2019–20 UEFA Youth League. He was called up several times to the senior squad in the summer of 2020, but remained on the bench.

On 5 October 2020, he joined Serie B club Pescara on loan. He made his Serie B debut for Pescara on 2 November 2020 in a game against Lecce. He started the game and played the full match.

On 20 July 2021, Guth joined newly promoted Eredivisie club Nijmegen on a season-long loan.

On 22 July 2022, Guth signed a five-year contract with Fortuna Sittard.

International career
Guth represented Brazil at the 2017 South American U-17 Championship and the 2017 FIFA U-17 World Cup.

He also possesses German nationality.

References

External links
 
 Career stats & Profile - Voetbal International

2000 births
Footballers from Curitiba
Brazilian people of German descent
Living people
Brazilian footballers
Brazil youth international footballers
Brazil under-20 international footballers
German footballers
Association football defenders
Atalanta B.C. players
Delfino Pescara 1936 players
NEC Nijmegen players
Fortuna Sittard players
Serie B players
Eredivisie players
Brazilian expatriate footballers
Expatriate footballers in Italy
Brazilian expatriate sportspeople in Italy
Expatriate footballers in the Netherlands
Brazilian expatriate sportspeople in the Netherlands